Faith in Place is an American organization based in Chicago, Illinois that coordinates religious leaders to address environmental sustainability issues. Partnering with religious congregations, Faith in Place promotes clean energy and sustainable farming. Since 1999, Faith in Place has partnered with over 700 congregations in Illinois.

Faith in Place has established cooperative fair trade markets, and, for a time, the Eco-Halal cooperative for "Muslim consumers to purchase sustainably raised lamb, chicken, and beef".

History
Started in 1999, as a project of the Center for Neighborhood Technology, it later incorporated as an independent organization. Initially the group worked in seven location to develop projects and then expanded to regional coordination. In 2003 they incorporated officially and moved to independent offices in late 2004.

Activities and projects
Faith in Place works with religious organizations in an effort to "promote stewardship of the Earth as a moral obligation".

Illinois Interfaith Power & Light Campaign
Their Illinois Interfaith Power & Light Campaign helps various religious groups conserve energy, purchase clean energy and advocates for conservation. Faith in Place is the Illinois chapter of the national Interfaith Power & Light campaign. They assisted the Jewish Reconstructionist Congregation in building the nation's first certified green synagogue. Another project they facilitated was Mosque Foundation in Bridgeview becoming the United States’ first mosque to go solar.

See also

 Ecotheology
 Religion and environmentalism
 Christianity and environmentalism
 Evangelical environmentalism
 Spiritual ecology
 Lutheran Volunteer Corps

Notes

 Chicago Public Radio (WBEZ), interview with Clare Butterfield, August 2005.

Religious action on climate change
Environmentalism and religion